Roscoe Inlet is a fjord in the North Coast region of the Canadian province of British Columbia. It lies east of the Florence Peninsula, north of Johnson Channel. Its southern half was first charted in 1793 by George Vancouver and Spelman Swaine  during their 1791-1795 expedition.

The inlet is in the Fiordland Conservancy, along with nearby Kynoch and Mussel Inlets.

References

External links

Fjords of British Columbia
North Coast of British Columbia
Inlets of British Columbia